Warren Township is one of the twenty-two townships of Washington County, Ohio, United States.  The 2000 census found 4,044 people in the township.

Geography
Located in the southern part of the county along the Ohio River, it borders the following townships:
Watertown Township - north
Muskingum Township - northeast
Marietta Township - east
Dunham Township - southwest
Barlow Township - west

Wood County, West Virginia lies across the Ohio River to the southeast.

Small portions of the county seat of Marietta are located in northeastern Warren Township.

Name and history
It is one of five Warren Townships statewide.

Government
The township is governed by a three-member board of trustees, who are elected in November of odd-numbered years to a four-year term beginning on the following January 1. Two are elected in the year after the presidential election and one is elected in the year before it. There is also an elected township fiscal officer, who serves a four-year term beginning on April 1 of the year after the election, which is held in November of the year before the presidential election. Vacancies in the fiscal officership or on the board of trustees are filled by the remaining trustees.

References

External links
County website

Townships in Washington County, Ohio
Townships in Ohio